Stănceşti may refer to several villages in Romania:

 Stănceşti, a village in Vadu Pașii Commune, Buzău County
 Stănceşti and Stănceşti-Larga, villages in Mușetești Commune, Gorj County
 Stănceşti, a village in the town of Strehaia, Mehedinţi County
 Stănceşti, a village in Târgșoru Vechi Commune, Prahova County

See also
 Stânceşti (disambiguation)
 Stanca (disambiguation)